Mississauga City Council is the governing body of the city of Mississauga, Ontario, Canada.

The council consists of the mayor and 11 councillors elected to serve a four-year term. The last municipal election was held October 24, 2022 and the next will be held in 2026. All members of council, including the mayor, are also simultaneously members of the Peel Regional Council.

2022-2026
Council elected in the 2022 municipal election .

2018–2022
Council elected in the 2018 municipal election.

2014–2018
Council elected in the 2014 municipal election and subsequent by-elections:

2010–2014
Council elected in the 2010 municipal election and subsequent by-elections:

2006–2010
Council elected in the 2006 municipal election:

References

External links
 Map of Mississauga Wards

Municipal councils in Ontario
City Council, Mississauga